Petersburg Bus (Петербу́ргский авто́бус) is one of transport systems of the city of Saint Petersburg and its suburbs. The Committee for Transportation of Saint Petersburg Government (Комитет по транспорту Правительства Санкт-Петербурга) is the main operator of the buses transport in the city. Under the Committee works a various types of transport companies such as Passazhiravtotrans (state unitary enterprise) and West-Service LLC, Third Park РJSC, Domtransauto LLC, Taksi LLC (Taxi).

History
The first buses began to circulate in 1907 and were operated by Saint Petersburg Automobile-Omnibus Company (Санкт-Петербургское товарищество автомобильно-омнибусного сообщения). During  World War I, all the municipal transport was stopped, and didn't recover until the end of the October Revolution. The buses system was relaunched in Leningrad on July 8, 1926. The first Russian-made bus was Ya-6 which was manufactured by ARZ.
The first bus company was Lenkomtrans (Ленкомтранса) which was later renamed to Passazhiravtotrans  (Пассажиравтотранс). During World War II all the transportation was operated by the Red Army. In March 1945 the city council recovered the buses system and started to manufacture their own buses made by AZUL factory. After the dissolution of the Soviet Union, the buses were operated by Passazhiravtotrans which become the main operator but not the only one. Since July 2012 there are night lines in the city.

As well as Passazhiravtotrans there are other bus operators such as West-Service LLC, Third Park РJSC, Domtransauto LLC, Taksi LLC (Taxi).

References

1907 establishments in the Russian Empire
Buses of Russia
Transport in Saint Petersburg